The Bushcaddy L-164 is a Canadian kit aircraft that was designed by Sean Gilmore and produced by Canadian Light Aircraft Sales and Service and most recently by Bushcaddy. The aircraft is supplied as a kit for amateur construction.

Design and development
The L-164 was developed from the Bushcaddy L-162 as a true four-seat aircraft.

The L-164 features a strut-braced high-wing, a four-seat enclosed cockpit, fixed conventional landing gear, or optionally tricycle landing gear, and a single engine in tractor configuration. Floats and skis can also be fitted.

The aircraft fuselage is made with a frame of welded 6061-T6 aluminum square tubing, covered in 6061-T6 sheet. Its  span wing employs V-struts with jury struts. Cabin access is via two fold-up doors.

Construction time for the factory kit is estimated at 1200 hours or 300 hours from the quick-build kit. Four examples had been completed and flown by December 2011.

Variants
L-164 B
Passenger model.
L-164 C
All cargo model.

Specifications (L-164)

References

External links
Official website

Homebuilt aircraft
Single-engined tractor aircraft
High-wing aircraft